Robert Kendall is a digital poet. Canadian-born, he now lives in the United States. He has a master's degree in Musicology and has taught electronic poetry for the New School University's online course.

 Kendall refers to these two early poems as "SoftPoems", in which words and phrases are animated to match movement with meaning. He later worked with Visual Basic, using this Microsoft programming language to create a book-length hypertext poem, A Life Set for Two, in 1996. Kendall has also created work for Flash and the Web. Kendall serves on the board of directors for the Electronic Literature Organization.

Works
Kendall, Robert (2006). Logoza.
Kendall, Robert (2004). Candles for a Street Corner. A work of multimedia poetry.
Kendall, Robert (2002). Clues. A work of detective noir interactive poetry.
Kendall, Robert (2001). Faith. A work of kinetic concrete poetry.
Kendall, Robert (2000). A Study in Shades. A a two part poem about dealing with Alzheimer's disease.

See also

Eastgate Systems
Hypertext

References

External links
Kendall's homepage
Robert Kendall feature article, The Cortland Review, Fall 2002.
A Study in Shades, interactive poem on BBC Online.

20th-century American poets
Living people
20th-century Canadian poets
20th-century Canadian male writers
Canadian male poets
Poets from California
Year of birth missing (living people)
Electronic literature writers